Brasilennea arethusae is a fossil species of air-breathing land snail, a terrestrial pulmonate gastropod mollusk in the family Cerionidae, from the Paleocene Itaboraí Basin, Brazil. Brasilennea arethusae is the largest species in the genus Brasilennea. It was one of the first fossils found in Itaboraí Basin and its name makes reference to the fact that it is a terrestrial species: the name is in honor of Arethusa, a sylvan nymph and one of the Hesperides from Greek mythology.

References 

Cerionidae
Paleocene gastropods
Paleocene animals of South America
Itaboraian
Paleogene Brazil
Fossils of Brazil
Fossil taxa described in 1935